Nextcloud is a suite of client-server software for creating and using file hosting services. Nextcloud provides functionally similar to Dropbox, Office 365 or Google Drive when used with integrated office suites Collabora Online or OnlyOffice. It can be hosted in the cloud or on-premises. It is scalable from home office software based on the low cost Raspberry Pi all the way through to full sized data centers that support millions of users. Translations in 60 languages exist for web interface and client applications.

Features 

Nextcloud files are stored in conventional directory structures, accessible via WebDAV if necessary. A SQLite, MySQL or PostgreSQL database is required to provide additional functionality like permissions, shares, and comments.

Nextcloud can synchronize with local clients running Windows (Windows 7, 8, and 10), macOS (10.6 or later), or various Linux distributions. Nextcloud permits user and group administration locally or via different Backends like OpenID or LDAP. Content can be shared inside the system by defining granular read/write permissions between users and groups. Nextcloud users can create public URLs when sharing files.

Logging of file-related actions, as well as disallowing access based on file access rules is also available.

Security options like Multi-factor authentication using TOTP, WebAuthn, Oauth2, OpenID Connect, Brute-force protectionexist. 

Nextcloud has planned new features such as monitoring capabilities, full-text search and Kerberos authentication, as well as audio/video conferencing, expanded federation and smaller user interface improvements.

Nextcloud Box 

In September 2016, Nextcloud, in cooperation with Western Digital Labs and Canonical (the company behind Ubuntu), released the Nextcloud Box. The Nextcloud box was based on a Raspberry Pi, running Ubuntu Core with Snappy; it was intended to serve as a reference device for other vendors. In June 2017, Western Digital shut down Western Digital Labs,  which caused the production of the box to end.

History 
In April 2016 Frank Karlitschek and most core contributors  left ownCloud Inc. These included some of ownCloud's staff according to sources near to the ownCloud community.

The fork was preceded by a blog post of Karlitschek, asking questions such as "Who owns the community? Who owns ownCloud itself? And what matters more, short term money or long term responsibility and growth?" There have been no official statements about the reason for the fork. However, Karlitschek mentioned the fork several times in a talk at the 2018 FOSDEM conference, emphasizing cultural mismatch between open source developers and business oriented people not used to the open source community.

On June 2, within 12 hours of the announcement of the fork, the American entity "ownCloud Inc." announced that it is shutting down with immediate effect, stating that "[…] main lenders in the US have cancelled our credit. Following American law, we are forced to close the doors of ownCloud, Inc. with immediate effect and terminate the contracts of 8 employees.". ownCloud Inc. accused Karlitschek of poaching developers, while Nextcloud developers such as Arthur Schiwon stated that he "decided to quit because not everything in the ownCloud Inc. company world evolved as I imagined".  ownCloud GmbH continued operations, secured financing from new investors and took over the business of ownCloud Inc.

In April 2018 Informationstechnikzentrum Bund (ITZBund) reported Nextcloud wins the tender for "Bundescloud" (Germany government cloud) project. 

In August 2019 was released to the public government of France, Sweden and Netherlands will use Nextcloud for file transfer. 

In January 2020 Nextcloud 18 "Nextcloud Hub" was released. The major change was direct integration of an Office suite (OnlyOffice) and Nextcloud claimed the goal to compete with Office 365 and Google Docs.  Partnership with Ionos was made revealed  - it's hosting location in Germany and compliance with GDPR should support the goal of data sovereignty. 

In spring 2020 remote work and web conferencing usage raised due to COVID-19 pandemic and Nextcloud released version 19 with chat and videoconferencing Talk app integrated into the application core. Talk with an optional "high performance back-end"  allows self-hosting of web conferences with more than 10 participants. Collabora Online was introduced as another integrated office suite.

In August 2021 Nextcloud was chosen as collaboration platform for European cloud software GAIA-X. 

In Sep 2021 Nextcloud is mentioned as "success case" and "most widely deployed Open Source content collaboration platform" in an "Open Source Study" of European Commission. 

25 April to 10 May 2022 "Open Source Programme Office" at the European Commission organizes NextGov Hackathon and awards up to 5000 EUR for improvements to Nextcloud apps and security.

See also 

 Seafile (FOSS client-server software for file storage and transfer)
 Comparison of file hosting services
 Comparison of file synchronization software
 Comparison of online backup services

References

External links 

 

 
Cloud computing
Cloud storage
File hosting
Free software for cloud computing
Free software programmed in JavaScript
Free software programmed in PHP
Software using the GNU AGPL license